Carl Jeffrey Posy is an Israeli philosopher. He is a full professor emeritus in the Department of Philosophy at the Hebrew University of Jerusalem in Jerusalem, Israel.

Carl Posy received his PhD degree from Yale University in the United States in 1971.

Posy's areas of research interest include the philosophy of mathematics, philosophical logic, the history of philosophy (particularly Kant and his predecessors). His publications include:

 Kant’s Philosophy of Mathematics: Modern Essays, Springer, 1992. 
 Computability: Turing, Gödel, Church, and Beyond (with Jack Copeland and Oron Shagrir), MIT Press, 2013. .

Posy is a former Academic Director of the National Library of Israel.

References

External links
 Carl Posy home page
 Carl Posy on Academia.edu

Year of birth missing (living people)
Living people
Yale University alumni
21st-century Israeli philosophers
Academic staff of the Hebrew University of Jerusalem
Historians of mathematics
Historians of philosophy
Jewish philosophers
Israeli historians
Kantian philosophers
Librarians at the National Library of Israel
Logicians
Scholars of modern philosophy